Cuba competed at the 2012 Summer Paralympics in London, United Kingdom from August 29 to September 9, 2012.

Medallists

Athletics 

Men's Track and Road Events

Men's Field Events

Women's Track and Road Events

Cycling

Road

Men

Track

Time Trial

Individual Pursuit

Judo

Powerlifting 

Men

Shooting

Swimming 

Men

See also

 Cuba at the 2012 Summer Olympics

References

Nations at the 2012 Summer Paralympics
2012
2012 in Cuban sport
Disability in Cuba